P35 may refer to:

Military 
 Seversky P-35, an American fighter aircraft
 Browning Hi-Power, a pistol
 P-35 radar, a Soviet radar system
 Program 35, a satellite program of the United States Armed Forces
 P-35 Progress, a variant of the SS-N-3 Shaddock cruise missile

Vessels 
 , a ship of the Argentine Navy
 , a P-class sloop of the Royal Navy
 , a submarine of the Royal Navy
 , a corvette of the Indian Navy

Genes and proteins
 CDK5R1, an enzyme
 Early 35 kDa protein, a baculoviral protein
 IL12A, Interleukin-12 subunit alpha
 P35 holin family

Other uses
 Beechcraft P35 Bonanza, an American general aviation aircraft
 Intel P35, a motherboard chipset
 Nissan P35, a cancelled car model
 Papyrus 35, a biblical manuscript
 Phosphorus-35, an isotope of phosphorus